New and Groovy is the eighth album led by American jazz vibraphonist Johnny Lytle which was recorded in 1966 for the Tuba label.

Reception

The Allmusic site awarded the album 4 stars stating "New and Groovy was appropriately titled. The soul of Lytle's vibes came with an ambience that's reflected in each one of these compositions".

Track listing
All compositions by Johnny Lytle except as indicated
 "The Snapper" - 2:19  
 "Summertime" (George Gershwin, Ira Gershwin, DuBose Heyward) - 4:15  
 "Selim" - 3:32  
 "The Shadow of Your Smile" (Johnny Mandel, Paul Francis Webster) - 3:39  
 "Come and Get It" - 4:19  
 "The Pulpit" - 4:00  
 "Too Close for Comfort" (Jerry Bock, Larry Holofcener, George David Weiss) - 3:48  
 "Chanukah" - 2:30  
 "Screamin' Loud" - 2:46  
 "El Marcel" - 3:55

Personnel 
Johnny Lytle - vibraphone
Wynton Kelly - piano (tracks 2-10)
Milton Harris - organ 
George Duvivier - bass
Jimmy Cobb (tracks 3, 5, 6, 8 & 9), William "Peppy" Hinnant (tracks 1, 2, 4, 7 & 10) - drums
Montego Joe - congas

References 

1966 albums
Johnny Lytle albums
Albums produced by Orrin Keepnews